Gabriel Piguet (born 24 Feb 1887 at Mâcon, died 3 July 1952 at Clermont-Ferrand)  was the Roman Catholic  Bishop of Clermont-Ferrand, France. Involved in Catholic resistance to Nazism, he was imprisoned in the Priest Barracks of Dachau Concentration Camp in 1944. He has been honoured as a Righteous Gentile by Yad Vashem, Israel's Holocaust Memorial.

During the Second World War, Piguet allowed Jewish children to be hidden from the Nazis at the Saint Marguerite Catholic boarding school in Clermont-Ferrand. He was arrested by German police in his Cathedral on 28 May 1944 for the crime of giving aid to a priest wanted by the Gestapo. Imprisoned first in Clermont-Ferrand, he was deported to Dachau Concentration Camp in September.

At Dachau, Piguet presided over the secret ordination of Blessed Karl Leisner, who died soon after the liberation of the camp. He survived his imprisonment, though physically diminished - he had lost 35 kg. He died seven years later.

See also

French Resistance
Catholic resistance to Nazism

References

External links
 Gabriel Piguet at Yad Vashem website

Catholic resistance to Nazi Germany
French Resistance members
Catholic Righteous Among the Nations
French Righteous Among the Nations
Bishops of Clermont
20th-century Roman Catholic bishops in France
Dachau concentration camp survivors
People from Mâcon
1887 births
1952 deaths